Kaurin is a surname. Notable people with the surname include:

Edvard Kaurin Barth, Norwegian zoologist and photographer
Jens Matthias Pram Kaurin (1804–1863), Norwegian professor of theology, biblical translator, and Lutheran priest
Leni Larsen Kaurin (born 1981), Norwegian footballer